Gyaspur is a hamlet in western Uttar Pradesh, India, most probably named after Ghiyasuddin Balban, a ruler from the slave dynasty; leading to the guesstimate that the village would have been made around 1266 to 1287 AD. The main caste of the village is Tyagi. The village made tremendous sacrifices towards the struggle for Indian freedom. In 1857, the people of this village were persecuted by the British for participating in the rebellion which resulted in the lynching of 5 horse-driven British officers, who came to the village to subdue the rebellion. In retribution for the death of 5 British officers, without actual knowledge of their killers, British rulers imposed harsh sanctions resulting in severe hardship for the inhabitants of Gyaspur and 4 other surrounding villages: Kumheda, Khindora, Bhaneda, and Suhana. As a result, the villagers suffered tremendously for almost a century until the country gained independence. The village is well-known in the local area. Mr. Manmohan Tyagi is the current Pradhan of the village.

References
ghaziabad

External links
 wikimapia map
 Ghiyas ud din Balban

Villages in Ghaziabad district, India